Created on 2 April 1996, Musique Classique was a television channel owned by AB Groupe.

The programming consisted of classical concerts, opera, lyrical works, and magazine programmes (e.g. À livret ouvert...).

The channel was run by Jean-Michel Fava.

Musique Classique was shown on the AB Sat package, some cable operators, such as Noos-Numericable (see also Numericable (NOOS)) and ADSL operators such as  Freebox TV. The channel was not available on Canalsat or TPS.

History
On October 15, 2007, at 10:00 AM, the channel ceased broadcasting to make way for Ciné First, which also stopped in September 2010.

References

External links
 
Logos of the channel

Mediawan Thematics
Defunct television channels in France
Television channels and stations established in 1996
Television channels and stations disestablished in 2007
1996 establishments in France
2007 disestablishments in France